Dewey Bryan Saunders (born August 27, 1983), also known by his stage name Dewey Decibel (and formerly Unless and Emcee Unless), is a visual artist and rapper based in Los Angeles, CA. From 2008 to 2011, Saunders released music under the name Emcee Unless; in 2011 he changed his stage name to Dewey Decibel. In 2016 he changed his stage name once more to a shortened version of his birth name, Dewey Bryan.

Discography
Albums
 Memories of the Future (2008) (as Emcee Unless, with Raw Thrills)

EPs
 Forword (2009) (with Rick Friedrich, as The Rubix Qube Exclusive)
 Less Is More (2010) (as Emcee Unless)
 Preface (2011) (with Rick Friedrich, as The Rubix Qube Exclusive)
 Son of a Beach (2012) (with Rick Friedrich)
 A Different Drum (2015) (with Zilla Rocca)
 Sub Cult (2015) (with Rick Friedrich)

Mixtapes
 Dewdrops on a Lotus Leaf (2011) (beats by Flying Lotus)
 #BoomboxBookworm (2012) (beats by Eligh)

Singles
 "Ashes (Zilla Rocca Remix)" (2011) (as Emcee Unless)
 "Met Her in L.A." (2012)
 "Love" (2012)
 "Never Gave a Shit" (2014)
 "Waverider" (2015)
 "Drippy / Syrup" (2019) (with Drusef, as The Sauce)
 "Lowkey / Ride" (2020) (with Drusef, as The Sauce)

Featured tracks
 "Two Sides" on Wormhole Presents... A New Plague of Diseased Language Cocoons Vol. 2 (2010) (as Emcee Unless)

Guest appearances
 Noah23 - "Two Sides" on Pirate Utopias (77 Lost Scrolls) (2011)
 Zilla Rocca - "Chic-O-Stic" on Neo Noir (2013)
 Noah23 x Blown - "Boom Bap" on Noah23 x Blown (2015)
 Curly Castro & Fakts One - "Rammellzeed" on Restroy & Debuild (2015)
 Lustre - "Luxurious" on Heart Divine (2015)
 Career Crooks - "Newlywed" on Good Luck with That (2017)

References

External links
 Official website (visual art only)
 Dewey Saunders on Twitter
 Dewey Decibel on Rate Your Music

Underground rappers
Living people
Rappers from Florida
Rappers from Philadelphia
1983 births
People from Boynton Beach, Florida
21st-century American rappers